= Third Bastion of the Trinity Fortress Monument =

Monument in Taganrog, Rostov, Russia

Monument "The Third Bastion of the Trinity Fortress"
- Russian: Памятник "Третий бастион Троицкой крепости"
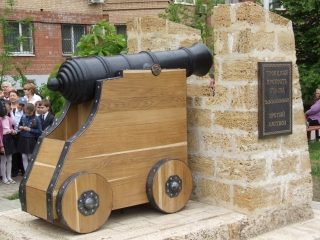
- Interactive map of Monument "The Third Bastion of the Trinity Fortress"
- Location: Petrovskaya str. 15, Taganrog, Rostov Oblast, Russia
- Coordinates: 47°12′26″N 38°56′30″E
- Opening date: 2015

Monument "The Third Bastion of the Trinity Fortress"(Russian: Памятник «Третий бастион Троицкой крепости») is a monument that was installed in 2015 in Str. Petrovskaya, 15 in Taganrog, Rostov Region, Russia to commemorate the location of the city's historical Trinity Fortress.

== Description ==
The monument was unveiled on May 15, 2015. It consists of a cannon placed near a fragment of the fortress wall. It is installed on the location where the third bastion of the Trinity Fortress once actually stood. The direction of the gun was chosen not by accident. Still, according to the monument designer's intention to represent the protection of the seaport from enemies that could attack from the steppes. The fragment of the wall was located on the basis of cartographic data showing where the "wall of the battlefield" was originally located and was constructed from material obtained during a reconstruction of the historic part of the city.

The idea of creating and financing the monument to the Third Bastion of the Trinity Fortress was due to the members of the Taganrog Historical Fund. The founder of the Taganrog Historical Foundation noted that in the future it would be possible to install another 13 such monuments to help define the borders of the Trinity Fortress.

Taganrog businessmen helped during the creation of the monument, not only financially; some provided the necessary materials for the manufacture of the monument and others produced some of its constituent parts.
